The system of auto trails was an informal network of marked routes that existed in the United States and Canada in the early part of the 20th century.  Marked with colored bands on utility poles, the trails were intended to help travellers in the early days of the automobile.

Auto trails were usually marked and sometimes maintained by organizations of private individuals. Some, such as the Lincoln Highway, maintained by the Lincoln Highway Association, were well-known and well-organized, while others were the work of fly-by-night promoters, to the point that anyone with enough paint and the will to do so could set up a trail.  Trails were not usually linked to road improvements, although counties and states often prioritized road improvements because they were on trails.

In the mid-to-late 1920s, the auto trails were essentially replaced with the United States Numbered Highway System.  The Canadian provinces had also begun implementing similar numbering schemes.

List of auto trails

See also 
List of historic auto trails in Iowa
List of U.S. Routes
U.S. Highway association

References

External links 
North American Auto Trails
Richard F. Weingroff, From Names to Numbers: The Origins of the U.S. Numbered Highway System